Mileewinae is a small subfamily in the family Cicadellidae (leafhoppers). It is closely related to Typhlocybinae and contains species that were previously part of Cicadellinae.

Description
Mileewinae leafhoppers are small, slender, and usually quite dark in colouration, with blue and yellow accents. They often rest with their wings unfolded, unlike most leafhoppers.

Distribution
Members of the subfamily are found feeding on Dicotyledon  herbs in the Afrotropical, Indomalayan, Neotropical, and  Australian realms.

Tribes and genera
There are four tribes in the subfamily.

Makilingini
Erected by Evans in 1947. A monotypic tribe found in the Indomalayan realm.
 Makilingia Baker, 1914

Mileewini
Erected by Evans in 1947. They are found throughout the entire range of the subfamily.
 Amahuaka Melichar, 1926
 Archeguina Young, 1993
 Eomileewa Gebicki & Szwedo, 2001
 Mileewa Distant, 1908
 Teniwitta Szwedo, 2019
 Ujna Distant, 1908
 Youngeewa Gebicki & Szwedo, 2001

Tinteromini
A monotypic tribe erected by Godoy & Webb in 1994.
 Tinteromus Godoy & Webb, 1994

Tungurahualini
Erected by Dietrich in 2011
 Ilyapa Dietrich, 2011
 Tungurahuala Kramer, 1965

References

Cicadellidae
Hemiptera subfamilies